Cat Cubie (born 1981) is a Scottish television weather presenter who deputised when Reporting Scotland regular meteorologists were on maternity leave. 
Cubie was born in Scotland to Heather and Andrew Cubie and grew up in Edinburgh, attending George Watson's College before taking a psychology degree at Aberdeen University.

Recent work 
In 2009, Cubie was one of the presenters of the Euromillions slot on BBC 1. Cubie previously presented Movie Specials for Channel 4, The Surgery on BBC Switch and a number of live music shows, including The Next Big Thing and Live and Unsigned. She was also in the MTV Europe final of Pick Me and has been the voice of Living TV and Living 2.

Her first broadcast work was as a researcher for the BBC, on programmes such as Little Angels, Teen Angels, Level Up and Beat the Boss. 
 
On 20 January 2011, it was announced Cubie would fill in, while the existing forecasting team of Gail McGrane, Judith Ralston and Gillian Smart took maternity leave on BBC Scotland.

References

External links 
 https://web.archive.org/web/20090220165434/http://www.beccabarrmanagement.co.uk/cat-cubie.htm
 http://www.catcubie.co.uk/

People educated at George Watson's College
Scottish television presenters
Scottish women television presenters
Living people
Television personalities from Edinburgh
1981 births
BBC weather forecasters